Billy Wynne may refer to:
 Billy Wynne (baseball)
 Billy Wynne (minister)

See also
 Bill Wynne, American author and photographer
 Bill Wynne (baseball)